Codex Vaticanus 260 is one of the most important manuscripts of the treatise On the Soul by Aristotle. It is designated by the symbol U. Paleographically it had been assigned to the 11th century. It is written in Greek minuscule letters. The manuscript contains the complete text of the treatise. It belongs to the textual family ν, together with the manuscripts X v Ud Ad Q. 

The manuscript was cited by Trendelenburg, Torstrik, Biehl, Apelt, and Ross in their critical editions of the treatise On the Soul. Currently it is housed at the Vatican Library (Vat. gr. 260) in Rome.

Other manuscripts 

 Codex Vaticanus 253
 Codex Vaticanus 266
 Codex Coislinianus 386

Further reading 

 Paweł Siwek, Aristotelis tractatus De anima graece et latine, Desclée, Romae 1965. 

Manuscripts of the Vatican Library
11th-century manuscripts
Aristotelian manuscripts